The 1986 World Badminton Grand Prix was the fourth edition of the World Badminton Grand Prix finals. It was held in Kuala Lumpur, Malaysia, from December 16 to December 21, 1986.

Final results

References
Smash: World Grand Prix Finals, Kuala Lumpur 1986

World Grand Prix
World Badminton Grand Prix
B
Sport in Kuala Lumpur
1986 in Malaysian sport
Badminton tournaments in Malaysia